Rheingold is a surname, meaning "gold of the Rhine river".

Persons
 Arnold L. Rheingold, chemist
 Harriet Lange Rheingold, child development psychologist
 Howard Rheingold, media critic
 Joseph Rheingold, psychiatrist

See also 
 Reingold (disambiguation)

German-language surnames